The Souverain class was a type of two 74-gun ships of the line.

Ships 
 
Builder: Toulon
Ordered: 25 October 1755
Launched: December 1755
Fate: Captured by the British after the Battle of the Nile, 2 August 1798.

 
Builder: Toulon
Ordered: 29 May 1757
Launched: 22 May 1760
Fate: Hulked in 1784

Notes, citations, and references

Notes

Citations

References

 
74-gun ship of the line classes
Ship of the line classes from France
Ship classes of the French Navy